, often shortened simply to PreCure Splash Star, is a magical girl anime series produced by Toei Animation, and aired on TV Asahi between February 5, 2006 and January 28, 2007. It is the third series in Izumi Todo's Pretty Cure metaseries, following a new story different from the previous two series, featuring the second generation of Cures. The series is directed by Toshiaki Komura, who previously directed Kinnikuman Nisei. The character designs were done by Akira Inagami, who previously worked on the character designs on both previous installments. The series's topic and concept is based on Nature, with the concept deriving from the Japanese idiom , which symbolizes the beauties of Nature, or the traditional themes of natural beauty in Japanese aesthetics.

Plot
Saki Hyuuga and Mai Mishou met at age nine for the first time after they followed two glowing balls that flew towards the Sky Tree, a big tree situated on top of a mountain in their town. Five years later, they met again at the same place and became the new legendary warriors PreCure (Pretty Cure). Flappy and Choppy, spirits from the Land of Fountains, revealed that they were the glowing balls and the girls were chosen to protect the Fountain of Sun hidden in Saki and Mai's world, which they refer to as the Land of Fountains. Saki and Mai are transformed into Cure Bloom and Cure Egret using the spirits. Later they gained new forms to become Cure Bright and Cure Windy with help from two additional spirits Moop and Fuup. The villains of this series are the Dark Fall, who are searching for the Fountain of Sun, the last of the seven fountains that feed the World Tree - the source of all life forms for all worlds. The Leader of the Dark Fall has set his aim on this tree, and it is the Pretty Cure's job to protect it.

In the Splash Star movie, Sirlion, a warrior from Dark Fall, opens up a gateway to the Land of Clocks using directions from Mai. His plan to dominate the world is to halt the Eternal (Infinite) Clock and freeze time, cutting off everyone's future. Saki and Mai were already in disagreement after Saki overslept and Mai wandered off into a nearby clock store, causing them to miss the sign-up for the karaoke singing contest. After being thrown into an endless maze, Saki and Mai have to work in unison if they want to solve the puzzle.

Characters

Splash Star Pretty Cures 
The Splash Star Pretty Cures were warriors chosen by the Land of Fountains to restore the Seven Holy Fountains and prevent Dark Fall from taking over the land of greenery. In the later episodes, both Saki and Mai transform using the  harnessing the powers of Moop and Fuup.

  

The main protagonist. Saki is a 13/14-year-old cheerful athletic girl, a member of the girls' softball team of Yuunagi Middle School. Similar to Nagisa, Saki is excellent at sports and not being very good at school, loves sweets and has a large appetite. Unlike Nagisa, Saki has a mild personality and a habit of saying  whenever she gets excited. Saki is bright and adaptive, and she remains optimistic and sane when facing the unexpected. Although Saki appears childish at times, she is lenient and gregarious, and her cheerful and easygoing personality often brings people happiness and energy. Her family runs the Panpaka Pan bakery, and Saki is good at cooking and making delicious breads. She has a sister named Minori, who shares her room and annoys her once in a while. Saki also has a crush on Mai's older brother, Kazuya.
As Cure Bloom or Cure Bright, her short auburn hair becomes bright reddish blonde and is tied into a headband. Depending on her form, Cure Bloom's theme colors are magenta and gold and her element represents the earth, while Cure Bright's theme colors are lime green and magenta, and her element represents the moon.

  

The sub protagonist. Mai is a 13-year-old reserved academic girl, who likes arts over science and has a more gentle and innocent nature. Her father is an astronomer, her mother is an archeologist and her brother, Kazuya, wishes to become an astronaut when he grows up. She and her family live in an observatory. Mai is very observant and aware, often noticing subtle details that could have been neglected by an average observer.
As Cure Egret or Cure Windy, her long dark blue hair becomes dark purple and is tied into a long ponytail. Depending on her form, Cure Egret's theme colors is white and her element represents the sky, while Cure Windy's theme colors is light blue, and her element represents the Wind.
She introduces herself as  while as Cure Windy, she introduces herself as

Land of Fountains 

Spirit of the flower, he likes to eat rice and ends his sentences with the word "lapi". He seems to have a crush on Choppy, but she doesn't seem to notice or understand his feelings for her. He functions as the transformation device for Saki to transform into Cure Bloom and Cure Bright.

Spirit of the bird, she ends her sentences with the word "chopi". She functions as the transformation device for Mai to transform into Cure Egret and Cure Windy.

Mysterious spirit of the moon that appears in episode 24 and has some connection to Michiru. He ends his sentences with the word "mupu". The Kiryuu sisters once rescued Moop and Fuup from a falling tree at the Fountain of Sky.

Mysterious spirit of the wind that appears in episode 24 with Moop and has some connection to Kaoru. She ends her sentences with the word "pupu". Moop and Foop can use the powers of the moon and wind to power up Pretty Cure with the Spiral Ring Set, and they later serve as the power sources for Cure Bright and Cure Windy.

Princess of the Land of Fountains. She appears each time the Pretty Cure duo restores a ruined fountain and leaves them a keyword about what will happen in the future before she vanishes. In the last episode, Flappy reveals that Filia's true identity is the spirit of the World Tree.

Dark Fall

In episode 41, Goyan used the Fairy Carafe to bring the previously killed villains (except Michiru and Kaoru) back to life to defeat Pretty Cure.

The evil ruler of Dark Fall, he wants to take over the World Tree, and has managed to capture six of the seven fountains that irrigate it. He has sent out minions to search for the location of the last of these fountains, the Fountain of Sun. He appears as a shadow-covered, towering-robed demon-like being with a pair of glowing red eyes that shine out of the cave in which he lives.

 
 
Akudaikaan's aide. Ms. Shitataare calls him "Gōchan". Before his face-off against the girls, Goyan appears polite, mean and vicious, and the Dark Fall minions often laugh at him. He is the man behind the man, however, and his intent is to destroy the universe and take all lives with it. In episode 47, it is revealed that he was the one who has created Akudaikaan. After killing Akudaikaan, he transforms into a gigantic monster and has a fierce battle against the girls. He is eventually defeated by the Precure Spiral Heart Splash Star in the final episode. Before his final death, he has turned the Land of Greenery (the Earth of Saki and Mai's world) into the ruined world and blown the Earth into pieces, and he almost kills Cure Bloom and Cure Egret by taking them with him, but he disintegrates in the girls' finisher attack, killing him once and for all.

Karehaan is the first of the Dark Fall to attack Earth, and is also the weakest minion. He is sent to capture Flappy and Choppy in order to force them to tell where the Fountain of Sun is. When they refuse to reply, he begins to harm them until Saki and Mai step in and transform for the first time. He attack the Pretty Cure with wood-related Uzainaa monsters. His name is often mispronounced as "Curry-pan", much to his displeasure.

Moerumba is the second of the Dark Fall to attack Earth after Karehaan fails. His appearance is based on brazilian carnival dancers. He is feminine, speaks spanish and loves to dance and snap his fingers. He attacks Pretty Cure with powerful fire-related Uzainaa monsters. He calls Pretty Cure "Señorita" ("young lady"). Episode 41 has him flirt with Karehaan, who doesn't appreciate it.

Dorodoron is the third of the Dark Fall to attack Earth after Moerumba fails. He's an arachnid-like demon that travels underground instead of through the air. Dorodoron transforms earth-related objects such as rocks and cobblestones into Uzainaa monsters. He also occasionally takes advice from Michiru and Kaoru, despite his own ire that they are attacking when it is his turn to do so.

Ms. Shitataare is the fourth Dark Fall villain after Michiru and Kaoru. She's a dragon-themed villain and dresses in a modern adaption of a Hanfu mixed with a high-slit dress and manipulates water-related objects. She can turn anything related to water into an Uzainaa. According to Mupu and Fupu, she is the one who has destroyed both the Fountain of Water and the Fountain of Sky. The PreCure duo's both power-ups (first the Spiral Ring Set and then the Bright/Windy form) happen during the time when she's the main villain. Saki calls her "Hanamizu-taare" (note: hanamizu means nasal mucus) and she's the one who reveals that Michiru and Kaoru are still alive at the Dark Fall. Ms. Shitataare is seemingly ambitious and obsessed with her career as a Dark Fall minion. She uses all manners of tricks and disguises against Precure, and has once betrayed Goyan for personal credit.

The last Dark Fall villain after Ms. Shitataare. His skin is gold in color and he is the strongest of the Dark Fall. He likes to exercise and work out. Kintoleski respects strong opponents and appears noble, although he is oppressive and he forces the girls to follow his principles. He seems to prefer a rivalry with Precure over his mission to defeat them. He often buys bread from her family bakery. He occasionally provides guidance to the girls and their close ones at peacetime. He has fallen in love with Ms. Shitataare before they died in episode 45.

 (ep 14-19), Akemi Okamura (ep 20 onwards)
A mysterious girl who meets Saki and Mai at The Sky Tree in episode 14. She seems cold and rude. Kaoru is always with her younger sister, Michiru. They are later revealed to be part of the Dark Fall. Their duty is to guard the Fountain of Sky. They pretend to be transfer students of Yuunagi Junior High School in order to gather information about Pretty Cure. Kaoru has long blue hair and blue eyes. Kaoru and Michiru sacrifice their lives to protect Saki and Mai in episode 23. Later, in episode 42, they are revived by remnant powers from the Fairy Carafe and return to assist Pretty Cure in defeating the Dark Fall and Goyan.

Kaoru's younger sister. She has short red-violet hair and red-violet eyes. They both seem confused and clueless about the Land of Greenery at first, but quickly learn that "霧" means "fog" and "生" means "life, birth". In episode 23, Michiru and Kaoru use their last powers to save their precious friends, Saki and Mai, from Akudaikaan and send them back to the Land of Greenery.  Later, in episode 42, she and Kaoru return to assist Pretty Cure in defeating the Dark Fall and Goyan.

Much like the Zakenna before them, Uzainaa are monsters that can be fused with things (different members of the Dark Fall can fuse Uzainaa with things pertaining to different elements, for example, Karehaan used wood-related Uzainaa), when defeated, element spirits are released from them and thank Pretty Cure for freeing them.

Cures' families 

Saki and Minori's father who owns a bakery called PANPAKA.

Saki and Minori's mother who is a bread craftsman at PANPAKA.

Saki's younger sister.

Saki's cat who she took into custody five years before the series.

A notable astronomer who is Mai's father.

An archaeologist who is Mai's mother.

Mai's elder brother who also admires Saki.

Yuunagi Middle School
 is a junior high school that the Cures attend.

An English class teacher who is the Cures' homeroom and is advisor of the softball club.

Kenta is Saki's friend.

A member of the softball team alongside Saki.

An overweight classmate of Saki and Mai.

Ayano Takeuchi is Mai's good friend and member in the Art Club.

A classmate of the Cures who is a student councillor.

A classmate of the Cures who is the captain of the softball club Saki is in.

Media

Anime

The series is produced by Toei Animation and Asahi Broadcasting Corporation, having been broadcast across Japan by the anime television network, Animax and TV Asahi from February 5, 2006 to January 28, 2007.

Marvelous AQL also released several DVDs of the series before later being compiled into two DVD-Box sets by Pony Canyon. The first boxset is released on September 19, 2012 and the second in October 17, 2012.

Movie
A movie titled  was released on December 9, 2006.

Video game
A side-scrolling beat-em-up video game, Futari wa Precure Splash☆Star: Panpaka Game Never Better!  was released by Bandai for the Nintendo DS on November 30, 2006.

References

External links
 Toei Animation webpage 
 Toei Animation Futari wa Pretty Cure Splash Star The Movie: Chikutaku Kiki Ippattsu Homepage 
 4Anime
 

2007 Japanese television series endings
2007 comics endings
Splash Star
2006 anime films
2006 manga
Anime series
Manga series
Anime spin-offs
Magical girl anime and manga
TV Asahi original programming
Toei Animation television
Toei Animation films